HD 171819 (HR 6986) is a solitary star located in the southern constellation Telescopium. It has an apparent magnitude of 5.84, making it faintly visible to the naked eye if viewed under ideal conditions.

HD 171819 has a stellar classification of A7 IV/V, indicating that the object is an A-type star with a blended luminosity class of a main sequence star and subgiant. However, W. Buscombe gave it a class of A3 V, making it an ordinary A-type main-sequence star. At present it has 1.84 times the mass of the Sun and 3.9 times the radius of the Sun.

References

A-type main-sequence stars
A-type subgiants
Telescopium (constellation)
Telescopii, 22
Durchmusterung objects
171819
091461
6986